Buginese may refer to:

 Bugis people, or Buginese, an ethnic group of South Sulawesi, Indonesia
 Buginese language
 Buginese script, or Lontara script
 Buginese (Unicode block), a block of Unicode characters for the Buginese script

See also
 Bugis (disambiguation)

Language and nationality disambiguation pages